Komárovce is a village and municipality in Košice-okolie District in the Kosice Region of eastern Slovakia.

History
Historically, the village was first mentioned in 1402.

Geography
The village lies at an altitude of 205 metres and covers an area of 8.497 km².
It has a population of about 385 people.

Genealogical resources

The records for genealogical research are available at the state archive "Statny Archiv in Kosice, Slovakia"

 Roman Catholic church records (births/marriages/deaths): 1744-1896 (parish B)
 Greek Catholic church records (births/marriages/deaths): 1870-1902 (parish B)

See also
 List of municipalities and towns in Slovakia

External links

Surnames of living people in Komarovce

Villages and municipalities in Košice-okolie District